Hammes Company (or Hammes Co.) is a healthcare consulting firm, providing strategic planning, facility development, and real estate advisory to the healthcare industry. Headquartered in Milwaukee, Wisconsin, Hammes Company grew from a real estate consulting firm founded in 1991 to the No. 1 developer of healthcare facilities in the United States by 2000. With the 2007 acquisition of Health Inventures, Hammes Company expanded its presence into worldwide markets.

History
Hammes Company was founded in 1991 as a real estate consulting firm. By December 1993, Hammes had five partners who watched over development of more than $100 million in property and $25 million in corporate, public sector and hospital facility development in five Midwestern states. In the mid-1990s, Hammes Company sought out other development work in the sports industry, creating Hammes Company Sports Development, Inc. This sports and entertainment division developed the University of Wisconsin–Madison's basketball and hockey arena, the Kohl Center. By 2003, Hammes had been ranked the No. 1 developer of health care facilities in the United States for the fourth consecutive year.

In January 2007, Hammes Co. purchased a majority interest in Health Inventures, a developer and manager of ambulatory surgery centers, surgical hospitals and diagnostic imaging centers worldwide. The acquisition expanded the presence of Hammes Co. from the United States into European markets. In June 2008, Hammes Co. agreed to manage the development of "the first new hospital to be built in the New Orleans area since Hurricane Katrina devastated the region." As of September 2008, Hammes Company had been ranked by Modern Healthcare magazine as the top developer of healthcare facilities in the country for the last nine years.

In the sports development unit, they have worked on the Kohl Center at UW–Madison, as well as serving as the construction manager for the $295 million renovation of Lambeau Field in Green Bay, Wisconsin. Hammes Company also was the project manager for the new $1.6 billion MetLife stadium for the New York Giants and the New York Jets in New Jersey. The stadium seats 80,000 fans and opened for the 2010 season.

Hammes Company has worked with several healthcare providers, including Aurora Health Care's new $189 million hospital located in Summit, Wisconsin, and Inova Health System's  medical office building  in northern Virginia. Hammes Company also belongs to the Society for Healthcare Strategy and Market Development.

References

External links
Hammes Company Web site
Hammes Company Sports Development Web site

Consulting firms of the United States
Consulting firms established in 1991
Health care companies established in 1991
Companies based in Wisconsin
Medical and health organizations based in Wisconsin
1991 establishments in Wisconsin